Aisa Bhi Hota Hai is a 1971 Bollywood film starring Deb Mukherjee, Nandita Bose, Tun Tun and Jalal Agha. It has gained a review of 3.5 out of 5 stars. The melodious music is by O.P. Nayyar and lyrics by S.H. Behari.

Producer

This movie is produced by Farah Khan's dad Kamran Khan

Soundtrack

References

External links

1971 films
Films scored by O. P. Nayyar
1970s Hindi-language films